Nadezhda (Esther) Markovna Ulanovskaya (1903—1986), AKA Nadia or Nadya, was a Soviet intelligence GRU officer, translator, English teacher, wife of Alexander Ulanovsky, and mother of Maya Ulanovskaya.

Background

Nadezhda Ulanovskaya was born Esther Markovna Fridgant in Bershad in the then Russian Empire (now Ukraine). Her father was a trader; her grandfather Nukhim Fridgant was a rabbi and possibly a descendant of a Hasidic tzaddik Reful (Friedgant). Ulanovskaya studied in private and village schools. In 1917, after the February Revolution, the family moved to Odessa.

Career

After the 1917 October Revolution, Ulanovskaya joined the Young Revolutionary International as an anarchist and changed her name from Esther to Nadezhda ("Hope"). During the Russian Civil War, she worked for the pro-Soviet underground in Odessa by distributing leaflets. At this time, she met her future husband, Alexander Ulanovsky. In April 1919, during the flight of White Russians from Odessa, she helped occupy the Odessa police station. In August 1919, ahead of the White Russian re-occupation of Odessa, she evacuated with Ulanovsky to Nikolaev (Mykolaiv in Ukraine) and eventually returned to Odessa. In 1921, she and Ulanovsky visited Germany on behalf of the Cheka. In 1922, they moved to Moscow.

Communism

In 1923, under the name of "Maria Andreyevna Sorokina," Ulanovskaya worked with her husband in Hamburg for the Profintern, after which the Ulanovskys returned to Moscow (still with the Profintern).

In 1928, the Ulanovskys joined the Soviet military intelligence service (or GRU). With Richard Sorge, they were stationed in Shanghai. In 1929, she went with her husband to China as a lieutenant for "technical work." Her job there was radio operator under the name of a Sudeten German "Kirschner." In 1930, the Ulanovskys were expelled from Shanghai.

In 1930–1931, the Ulanovskys lived in Berlin and Paris. In 1931, they traveled to the United States as Canadians named "Goldman" and then operated in the US under the surname "Zhuratovich." While stationed in New York 1932-4 as employees of AMTORG, one of the agents in their spy network was Whittaker Chambers. While stationed in the US, Ulanovskaya met her uncle, who had immigrated to the US in 1913.

At some point 1933–1935, the Ulanovskys were stationed in Denmark to support Soviet espionage in Germany (after Adolf Hitler's takeover in early 1933 and uprooting of Soviet intelligence in Germany). Her husband was caught and imprisoned in a public spy scandal.

In 1932 (or 1934?), Ulanovskaya returned to Moscow, where, still in Soviet military intelligence, she studied at the Institute of Foreign Languages through 1941. She also worked as an English teacher at the Frunze Military Academy.

During the Great Purge, the Ulanovskys "broke with the party." Ulanovsky had to leave the Fourth Section of the Red Army (Intelligence, aka GRU).

During World War II, Ulanovsky fought in the war, during which he was demoted to captain and wounded; Ulanovskaya sent her children East with her mother to Chelyabinsk for safety. She worked with foreign correspondents with the Commissariat of Foreign Affairs, including work in the Far East. In 1947, she taught English at the Institute of International Relations; in December 1947, she was dismissed due to pending arrest.

GULAG

On February 21, 1948, Ulanovskaya was arrested for treason, specifically the transfer of information about the Great Purge for Australian Godfrey Blunden for the 1947 book A Room on the Route published in the US. She was locked in solitary confinement in the Lefortovo prison. (Her husband was arrested on March 3, 1949.) Accused of working with a British and American spy, she was not allowed to sleep for 13 days and nights.

In 1951, she received a 15-year sentence in labor camps. She served time in Rechlag and then Dubravlag. (In 1951, her daughter was also arrested and in 1952 sentenced to 25 years.) In May 1956, Soviet authorities reclassified her crime to "disclosure of official secrets," reduced the sentence to the time already served, and released her.

Later years

In 1961, her younger daughter died. In 1971, her husband died.

In 1973, Ulanovskaya immigrated to Israel with her daughter Maya, son-in-law, and grandson.

In 1977, mother and daughter visited Godfrey Blunden in Europe.

On July 17, 1977, C. L. Sulzberger of the New York Times published a memoir of Ulanovskaya from his days in Moscow as bureau chief 1943–5.

On July 26, 1977, in London, Ulanovskaya appeared on an episode called "The Soviet Intelligence Apparatus" on Firing Line, a talk show hosted by William F. Buckley Jr.:   Ulanovskaya: When we were in the States [in the Thirties], it was the first time—not that I began to doubt, but that I felt, with some reason, we couldn't do what the capitalists had achieved... In the States, in spite of that terrible time of the Depression... to us it didn't look terrible at all.  Buckley: You mean by contrast with what you had experienced?  Ulanovskaya: We saw those jobless people who still ate better... You know, some Communist sympathizers once showed us some slums, but those slums didn't impress me at all. Buckley: Made you feel at home?  Ulanovskaya: Well, the way we personally lived in Moscow at that time was worse.

Personal life and death

By 1922, Ulanovskaya had married Alexander Ulanovsky. They had a son and two daughters, of whom one is named Maya Ulanovskaya.

According to Sulzberger's 1977 memoir, Ulanovskaya had never heard of Alger Hiss, and her husband had no contact with Kim Philby, Guy Burgess, or Donald McLean.

On January 5, 1983, Nadezhda Ulanovskaya died in Israel.

Works

In 1982, she published in the US, together with her daughter, a memoir book The Story of One Family.

Regarding the Hiss Case, Ulavoskaya wrote (quoted from the new English edition of their memoir): "My story has many parallels with that of Whittaker Chambers. We met the same people, and I can thus confirm his testimony."

See also

 Alexander Ulanovsky
 Maya Ulanovskaya
 Anatoly Yakobson
 Alexander Yakobson
 List of Gulag camps

References

External sources

 Firing Line - "The Soviet Intelligence Apparatus" with Nadia Ulanovskaia (video)
 Улановская Надежда Марковна (1903) (Ulanovskaya, Nadezhda Markovna)
 Улановская Надежда (Эстер) Марковна (1903-1986) (Ulanovskaya Nadezhda (Esther) Markovna)

1903 births
1986 deaths
Odesa Jews
People convicted of spying for the Soviet Union
GRU officers
People from Vinnytsia Oblast